Isael Álvarez (born 2 February 1974) is a Cuban boxer. He competed in the men's light heavyweight event at the 2000 Summer Olympics.

References

External links

1974 births
Living people
Cuban male boxers
Olympic boxers of Cuba
Boxers at the 2000 Summer Olympics
Place of birth missing (living people)
AIBA World Boxing Championships medalists
Light-heavyweight boxers